2000 ACC tournament popularly refers to the ACC men's basketball tournament.

2000 ACC tournament may also refer to:

 2000 ACC women's basketball tournament
 2000 ACC men's soccer tournament
 2000 ACC women's soccer tournament
 2000 Atlantic Coast Conference baseball tournament
 2000 Atlantic Coast Conference softball tournament